Borivoje "Bora" Kostić (14 June 1930 – 10 January 2011) was a Serbian footballer. Normally a prolific left winger, Kostić is regarded as one of finest Yugoslav players of his generation and was well known for powerful shot and free kick ability. He was part of the Yugoslav squad that won gold at the 1960 Summer Olympics.

During his club career he played for Red Star Belgrade, Lanerossi Vicenza and St. Louis Stars. He earned 33 caps and 26 goals for the Yugoslavia national football team, and participated in the 1960 European Nations' Cup. Kostić was no less prolific at the club level with Red Star Belgrade, for whom he remains to this day the all-time leading marksman with 158 league strikes.

Honours
Red Star Belgrade
 Yugoslav First League: 1955–56, 1956–57, 1958–59, 1959–60, 1963–64
 Yugoslav Cup: 1957–58, 1958–59, 1963–64
 Mitropa Cup: 1958

Yugoslavia
 UEFA European Championship: runner-up 1960
 Olympic gold medalist in 1960

Individual
UEFA European Championship Team of the Tournament: 1960
Yugoslav First League top scorer: 1958–59, 1959–60

References

External links
 
 
 
 Profile at Serbian national football team page

1930 births
2011 deaths
People from Obrenovac
Association football wingers
Association football forwards
Serbian footballers
Yugoslav expatriate footballers
Yugoslav footballers
Yugoslavia international footballers
1960 European Nations' Cup players
Red Star Belgrade footballers
Red Star Belgrade non-playing staff
L.R. Vicenza players
St. Louis Stars (soccer) players
Yugoslav First League players
National Professional Soccer League (1967) players
Serie A players
Expatriate footballers in Italy
Expatriate soccer players in the United States
Yugoslav expatriate sportspeople in Italy
Yugoslav expatriate sportspeople in the United States
Olympic footballers of Yugoslavia
Footballers at the 1960 Summer Olympics
Olympic gold medalists for Yugoslavia
Olympic medalists in football
Medalists at the 1960 Summer Olympics